Morogo may refer to:

 Morogo, an African leafy vegetable;
 Morogo, a town in Tanzania;
 William Morogo arap Saina, a Kenyan politician.
 Morogo, a character from the 1989 film Cheetah.